Diving was contested at the 1962 Asian Games in Senayan Swimming Stadium, Jakarta, Indonesia from 29 August to 1 September 1962.

Medalists

Men

Women

Medal table

References 

 The Straits Times, August 30 – September 3, 1962

External links
Medals

 
1962 Asian Games events
1962
Asian Games
1962 Asian Games